Simcoe North is a federal electoral district in central Ontario, Canada. It was established as a federal riding in 1867.

Demographics
According to the Canada 2011 Census; 2013 representation''

Ethnic groups: 87.8% White, 9.6% Aboriginal
Languages: 90.2% English, 4.0% French, 1.4% German 
Religions: 71.6% Christian (29.4% Catholic, 12.3% United Church, 10.0% Anglican, 5.2% Presbyterian, 2.9% Baptist, 1.2% Lutheran, 1.1% Pentecostal, 9.6% Other Christian), 26.9% None. 
Median income: $28,203 (2010) 
Average income: $36,463 (2010)

Geography
The district includes all of the north and eastern parts of Simcoe County. Municipalities and Indian reserves include Midland, Orillia, Penetanguishene, Tay, Tiny, Christian Island 30, Christian Island 30A, Severn, Ramara, Oro-Medonte (part) and Mnjikaning First Nation The area is 1,984 km2.

History
The electoral district was created in 1867 by the British North America Act. In 1867, it included the townships of Nottawasaga, Sunnidale, Vespra, Flos, Oro, Medonte, Orillia and Matchedash, Tiny and Tay, Balaklava and Robinson, and the Towns of Barrie and Collingwood. In 1882, it lost Oro, Medonte, Orillia and Matchedash, Tiny and Tay, and Balaklava and Robinson. In 1903, it gained Oro, but lost Barrie. In 1947, it lost Oro and gained Barrie. In 1966, it lost Nottawasaga, Sunnidale and Flos and gained Penetanguishene, Matchedash, Medonte, Orillia, Oro, and Tay. In 1976, it gained the townships of Mara, Rama and Tiny but Lost Barrie and Vespra. In 1987, it gained Flos Township, only to lose it again in the 1996 redistribution. In the 2003 redistribution, its southern boundary was altered slightly to follow the boundary of the new municipality of Springwater in neighbouring Simcoe—Grey with the municipalities of Oro-Medonte, Tiny and Tay in Simcoe North. In 2013, the riding lost all of Oro-Medonte west of 9 Line.

Riding associations

Riding associations are the local branches of the national political parties:

Members of Parliament

Simcoe North has elected the following Members of Parliament to represent it in the House of Commons of Canada:

Election results

Note: Results are preliminary as of 18 October 2008.

					

Note: Conservative vote is compared to the total of the Canadian Alliance vote and Progressive Conservative vote in 2000 election.

				
Note: Canadian Alliance vote is compared to the Reform vote in 1997 election.
			

	

	

					
	

				

Note: Progressive Conservative vote is compared to "National Government" vote in 1940 election.

					
Note: "National Government" vote is compared to Conservative vote in 1935 election.
				

					

Note: Conservative vote is compared to Government vote in 1917 election.

Note: Government vote is compared to Conservative vote in 1911 election, and Opposition vote is compared to Liberal vote.

	

	

	

 		
Note: popular vote compared to vote in 1896 general election.

See also
 List of Canadian federal electoral districts
 Past Canadian electoral districts

References

 Riding history from the Library of Parliament
 2011 results from Elections Canada
 Campaign expense data from Elections Canada

Notes

Ontario federal electoral districts
Midland, Ontario
Orillia
Penetanguishene